Márcio Ferreira, better known as Márcio Careca (born July 28, 1978), is a Brazilian former footballer who played as a left back.

Honours

Club

Santos
Campeonato Brasileiro Série A (1): 2004

Brasiliense
Campeonato Brasiliense (1): 2005

Vasco da Gama
Copa do Brasil (1): 2011

Ceará
Campeonato Cearense (1): 2012

External links
 sambafoot
 footballzz.co.uk
 CBF
 futpedia
 placar

1978 births
Living people
People from Duque de Caxias, Rio de Janeiro
Brazilian footballers
Association football fullbacks
Campeonato Brasileiro Série A players
Campeonato Brasileiro Série B players
Nova Iguaçu Futebol Clube players
Clube Atlético Juventus players
São Paulo FC players
Santos FC players
Brasiliense Futebol Clube players
Sociedade Esportiva Palmeiras players
Paraná Clube players
Grêmio Barueri Futebol players
CR Vasco da Gama players
Guarani FC players
Mirassol Futebol Clube
Ceará Sporting Club players
Esporte Clube Santo André
Sportspeople from Rio de Janeiro (state)